Breilly is a commune in the Somme department in Hauts-de-France in northern France.

Geography

Places of interest
 St Sulpice church
 St Louis chapel
 war memorial
 The "château de Breilly" (private location - ruins).

Population

See also
Communes of the Somme department

References

External links
 
 Breilly(Unofficial town website)

Communes of Somme (department)